Swanston is an English-language surname derived from Swanston in Scotland, or similar toponym. Notable people with this surname include:

 Charles Swanston (1789-1850), English merchant, banker, and politician
 Eliard Swanston (died 1651), English actor
 George Heriot Swanston (born 1814), Scottish map engraver
 Hamish Swanston (1933–2013), British theologian and historian
 James Beck Swanston (1878-1957), Canadian farmer, surgeon, and politician
 J. W. Swanston, 19th-century English printer

English-language surnames
Scottish surnames